The Bill Beaumont County Championship Division 3 (formerly County Championship Shield) is an annual rugby union competition in England between teams representing English counties. It was formed in 2005 when it known as the County Championship Plate (a competition which is now played by tier 2 sides)—changing to Shield by 2010 and Bill Beaumont Division 3 by 2017.  It is contested by third tier teams in the RFU County Championship. From 2010 Division 3 involves counties that are only able to select players from clubs at level five and below. The eight teams involved are divided roughly on geographic terms into two pools and play three games each.

From 2017 promotion has been implemented in the competition (previously the only way out of the division was by invitation).  As with the other county championship divisions, this occurs over two years as opposed to one, using a system of accumulative points from pool games to determine the top two teams (one from each group) that are promoted to tier 2.  Likewise the bottom two teams in tier 2 (again, one in each group) are relegated into tier 3 at the end of the two-year period.

Past winners

Number of wins
 Surrey (4)
 Dorset & Wilts (3)
 Durham County (2)
 Hampshire (2)
 Oxfordshire (2)
 Cumbria (1)
 Leicestershire (1)
 Notts, Lincs & Derbyshire (1)

Explanatory notes

References

External links 
 2011_results.pdf

2008 establishments in England
Division 3
Recurring sporting events established in 2008